October Noir is a gothic/doom metal band formed in Pensacola, Florida in 2016. They have released 3 full-length albums and 9 stand-alone singles.

Background
October Noir was started by Tom Noir in late 2016 and released the first album, The Haunting and the Powerful, on October 19, 2017. Drummer Daniel "Stickz" Bryant, guitarist Troy Lambert, and keyboardist Jackie "Jaxxx" Daniel would join Tom for live shows after the first album came out. In 2018, October Noir would release two singles, both being covers. "Pictures of Matchstick Men (RIPeter)", a Status Quo/Type O Negative cover, was released on April 14, 2018, and "Lips like Sugar", an Echo & the Bunnymen cover, was released on July 5, 2018.

On October 1, 2019, their second album, Thirteen, was released. Seven days later, guitarist Doug Lane and keyboardist Justin Thompson joined the band, completing the quartet. On January 14, 2020, a cover of Chris Isaak's "Wicked Game" was released, the first October Noir song where instruments were credited to each member of the quartet. They released two additional singles in 2020: "Race War", a Carnivore cover, and "Cry Little Sister", a Gerard McMahon cover.

On April 14, 2021, the Type O Negative cover "Love You to Death" was released to coincide with the 11-year anniversary of Peter Steele's death. In late June 2021, keyboardist Justin Thompson left the band due to personal reasons. October Noir released their third album, Fate, Wine, & Wisteria, on September 22, 2021. One month prior, one of their tracks, "Windows", was released as a single, the band's first single taken from any of their albums.

Style
The band's sound is heavily influenced by gothic metal pioneers Type O Negative, whom from they also derive much of their aesthetic and lyrical inspiration as well.

Members
Current members
 Tom Noir – vocals, bass (2016–present)
 Doug Lane – guitars (2019–present)
 Tyler Fleming – drums (2021-present)

Former members
 Troy Lambert – guitars (2017–2019)
 Jaxxx Daniel – keyboards (2017–2019)
 Justin Thompson – keyboards (2019–2021)
 Daniel "Stickz" Bryant – drums (2017–2021)

Discography

Studio albums
 The Haunting and the Powerful (2017)
 Thirteen (2019)
 Fate, Wine, & Wisteria (2021)
 The Haunting and the Powerful (Remaster) (2022)

Singles
 "Pictures of Matchstick Men (RIPeter)" (2018)
 "Lips Like Sugar" (2018)
 "Wicked Game" (2020)
 "Race War" (2020)
 "Cry Little Sister" (2020)
 "Love You to Death" (2021)
 "Windows" (2021)
 "Crimson and Clover" (2022)
 "Nights In White Satin" featuring "Denis Pauna" (2022)

References

10. https://www.threewitchesentertainment.com/post/october-noir-denis-pauna-if-type-o-negative-wrong-nights-in-white-satin

External links
 October Noir - Bandcamp
 October Noir - Encyclopaedia Metallum
 October Noir Music - Facebook
 Tom Noir (@OctoberNoir) - Twitter

American gothic metal musical groups
American doom metal musical groups
American gothic rock groups
Musical quartets
Musical groups from Florida
Musical groups established in 2016
2016 establishments in Florida